Bettye is a given name. Notable people with the name include:

Bettye Ackerman (1924–2006), American actress 
Bettye Caldwell (1924–2016), American educator and academic
Bettye Anne Case, American mathematician
Bettye Collier-Thomas (born 1941), American historian
Bettye Crutcher (1939–2022), American songwriter
Bettye Danoff (1923–2011), American golfer
Bettye Davis (1938–2018), American politician
Bettye Fahrenkamp (1923–1991), American politician
Bettye Frink (born 1933), American politician
Bettye Washington Greene (1935–1995), American industrial research chemist
Bettye Kimbrell (born 1936}, American quilter
Bettye Lane (1930–2012), American photojournalist
Bettye LaVette (born 1946), American soul singer-songwriter 
Bettye Stull (born 1931), American arts curator
Bettye Swann (born 1944), American soul singer

See also
Betye, given name
Bette (given name)
Betty, given name